Michael Lomax may refer to: 

Michael Lomax (born 1947), president and CEO of the United Negro College Fund
Michael Lomax (boxer) (born 1978), English boxer
Mike Lomax (born 1979), English footballer